This is a list of amphibians found in the Dominican Republic. There is a total of 47 amphibian species recorded in the Dominican Republic.
This list is derived from the database listing of AmphibiaWeb.

Frogs and Toads (Anura)

Bufonidae 
Order: Anura. 
Family: Bufonidae
Peltophryne fluviatica (CR)
Peltophryne fracta (EN)
Peltophryne guentheri (VU)
Rhinella marina (LC)

Eleutherodactylidae 
Order: Anura. 
Family: Eleutherodactylidae
Eleutherodactylus abbotti (LC)
Eleutherodactylus alcoae (EN)
Eleutherodactylus aporostegus 
Eleutherodactylus armstrongi (EN)
Eleutherodactylus audanti (VU)
Eleutherodactylus auriculatoides (EN)
Eleutherodactylus bothroboans 
Eleutherodactylus coqui (LC)
Eleutherodactylus diplasius 
Eleutherodactylus flavescens (NT)
Eleutherodactylus fowleri (CR)
Eleutherodactylus furcyensis (CR)
Eleutherodactylus haitianus (EN)
Eleutherodactylus heminota (EN)
Eleutherodactylus hypostenor (EN)
Eleutherodactylus inoptatus (LC)
Eleutherodactylus jugans (CR)
Eleutherodactylus leoncei (CR)
Eleutherodactylus melatrigonum 
Eleutherodactylus minutus (EN)
Eleutherodactylus montanus (EN)
Eleutherodactylus nortoni (CR)
Eleutherodactylus notidodes 
Eleutherodactylus parabates (CR)
Eleutherodactylus paralius 
Eleutherodactylus patriciae (EN)
Eleutherodactylus pictissimus (VU)
Eleutherodactylus pituinus (EN)
Eleutherodactylus probolaeus (EN)
Eleutherodactylus rucillensis 
Eleutherodactylus rufifemoralis (CR)
Eleutherodactylus ruthae (EN)
Eleutherodactylus schmidti (CR)
Eleutherodactylus sommeri 
Eleutherodactylus tychathrous 
Eleutherodactylus weinlandi (LC)
Eleutherodactylus wetmorei (VU)

Hylidae 
Order: Anura. 
Family: Hylidae
Hypsiboas heilprini (VU)
Osteopilus dominicensis (LC)
Osteopilus pulchrilineatus (EN)
Osteopilus vastus (EN)

Leptodactylidae 
Order: Anura. 
Family: Leptodactylidae 
Leptodactylus albilabris (LC)

Ranidae 
Order: Anura. 
Family: Ranidae
Rana catesbeiana (LC)

See also
 List of amphibians of Hispaniola

Notes

References 

 
Amphibians
Dominican Republic
Dominican Republic